The 1977 Texas Tech Red Raiders football team represented Texas Tech University as a emmebr of the Southwest Conference (SWC) during the 1977 NCAA Division I football season. In their third and final season under head coach Steve Sloan, the Red Raiders compiled a 7–5 record (4–4 against SWC opponents), outscored opponents by a combined total of 279 to 246, and finished in a tie for fourth place in the SWC.  The team played its home games at Clifford B. and Audrey Jones Stadium in Lubbock, Texas.

Schedule

Personnel

References

Texas Tech
Texas Tech Red Raiders football seasons
Texas Tech Red Raiders football